Conj may refer to:

Linguistics
 Conjugation (grammar)
 Conjunction (grammar)
  a part of speech tag

Mathematics 
 Conjugacy class, a partition of group into elements that share properties of a group.
 Conjugate (algebra), the image of an element in a quadratic extension field of a field K under the unique non-identity automorphism of the extended field that fixes K.
 Complex conjugate, one half of a pair of complex numbers, both having the same real part, but with imaginary parts of equal magnitude and opposite signs.
 conj, a function in programming languages such as C++ or MATLAB that computes the complex conjugate.

See also 
 Conjugation (disambiguation)
 Conjunction (disambiguation)